Dar Heydar (also Romanized as Dār Ḩeydar) is a village in Bavaleh Rural District, in the Central District of Sonqor County, Kermanshah Province, Iran. At the 2006 census, its population was 129, in 25 families.

References 

Populated places in Sonqor County